The Transpolar Drift Stream is a major ocean current of the Arctic Ocean, transporting surface waters and sea ice from the Laptev Sea and the East Siberian Sea towards Fram Strait. Drift experiments with ships such as the Fram or the Tara expedition showed that the drift takes between two and four years. Recent satellite data and the most recent drift experiment, MOSAiC, shows that the current has accelerated and ice drifts much faster than earlier, in less than two years across the Arctic Ocean.

In 1937, Pyotr Shirshov at the Soviet drift ice station North Pole-1 described this drift. Primarily wind-driven, it flows roughly from the northern coast of Russia and Alaska, sometimes curving toward the Beaufort Sea before exiting to the Atlantic Ocean. It has been cited as a major factor in the North Atlantic oscillation and Arctic oscillation atmospheric changes. The drift typically takes one of two paths before exiting into the northern Atlantic Ocean through the Fram Strait.

On decadal and longer timescales, the North Atlantic oscillation (NAO) and the Arctic oscillation (AO) indices affect the flow pattern of the transpolar drift stream.  During times of positive NAO (NAO+) and positive AO (AO+), there is a weak Arctic high and the associated surface winds produce a cyclonic (anti-clockwise) ice drift motion in eastern Arctic Ocean.  In this case, the drift flows from the Laptev Sea towards the Beaufort Sea before exiting the Arctic Ocean through the Fram Strait.  Conversely, during periods of NAO- and AO-, there is a strong Arctic high and ice motion flows in an anticyclonic (clockwise) motion in the Eurasian Basin.  In this phase, the drift flows directly from the Laptev Sea through the Fram Strait.

See also 
 Beaufort Gyre

References 
 Althoff, William F. Drift Station: Arctic Outposts of Superpower Science. Potomac Books Inc. 2007, Dulles, Virginia. p. 51
 Mysak, Lawrence A. "Patterns of Arctic Circulation", Science. New Series, Vol. 293, No. 5533 (Aug. 17, 2001), pp. 1269–1270.

Currents of the Arctic Ocean
Articles containing video clips

de:Eisdrift#Eisdrift in der Arktis